Lincoln Law School of San Jose is a private, non-profit law school located in San Jose, California. Founded in 1926, the law school was formerly part of Lincoln University, prior to achieving independence as an institution in 1993.

History 
The school traces its roots to 1919 when Dr. Benjamin Lickey and his wife Susan Lickey founded a law study program in San Francisco as a way to provide veterans and working-class students a part-time night school for law studies. 1932 graduate Kenneth Fung was the first Chinese American to be admitted to the practice of law in the state.

The school was incorporated in 1926 as a part of Lincoln University and located in San Francisco, becoming a non-profit institution in 1949. In 1961, a second law school campus was opened in San Jose, graduating its first class in 1965. By 1987, Lincoln University's entire law school program was concentrated in San Jose. In 1993, the San Jose campus formally separated from Lincoln University becoming an independent, public benefit, non-profit corporation, changing its name to Lincoln Law School of San Jose. The school moved to downtown San Jose in 1999. In 2000, the 25-year-old Peninsula University School of Law merged into Lincoln Law School.

Academics 
Lincoln is exclusively an evening-study program that lasts 4 or 4.5 years, depending upon the starting date of the student. 84 units of study are required for graduation with each unit equal to 15 hours of in-class instruction. Students usually attend classes 3 or 4 nights a week, with a few options for elective or seminar classes scheduled during the daytime on Saturdays.

Accreditation 
The school has been approved by the Committee of Bar Examiners of the State Bar of California since 1993, but the school is not accredited by the American Bar Association.  As a result, graduates are generally only eligible to take the California bar exam and practice in California. 

As of July 1, 2022, the school reported that it did not meet the State Bar of California five-year bar passage rate of 40 percent for state-accredited law schools and as a result, the school's accreditation will terminate on December 31, 2022.  The law school will operate as a registered, unaccredited fixed-facility law
school effective January 1, 2023.

Law Review 
Lincoln has published a student-produced law review since 1965.

Notable people 
Alumni
 David D. Cortese, current California State Senator and former Santa Clara County Supervisor
 Linda J. LeZotte, former San Jose City Councilmember
 Vartkes Yeghiayan, lawyer and legal activist for the victims of the Armenian genocide
Faculty
 Maya Harris, former Chair of the Kamala Harris 2020 presidential campaign
 James S. Ware, former Chief Judge of the U.S. District Court for the Northern District of California
 Rod Diridon Sr., former Chair of the California High Speed Rail Authority
 Desiree Reed-Francois, current Athletic Director of the University of Missouri

Notes

External links 
  

 
Educational institutions established in 1919
1919 establishments in California
Law schools in California
Universities and colleges in San Jose